National nature reserves in England were established by English Nature, now Natural England, which manages them either directly or through non-governmental organisations such as the Royal Society for the Protection of Birds or the National Trust.

There are 25 national nature reserves in Cumbria,  including the large Moor House-Upper Teesdale reserve which is shared with County Durham.

All national nature reserves include all or part of a named Site of Special Scientific Interest (SSSI).  Moor House-Upper Teesdale is also a Biosphere reserve.

Types of habitat
Wetlands

A number of the reserves are bogs (often called "moss" in local dialect), a type of habit which the European Union is keen to protect. 
Bassenthwaite Lake, one of the largest lakes in the English Lake District, is a habitat for the Osprey.

Limestone pavements
Whitbarrow and Park Wood are limestone habitats.

List

 Bassenthwaite Lake
 Blelham Bog
 Clawthorpe Fell
 Cliburn Moss
 Drumburgh Moss
 Duddon Mosses
 Finglandrigg Woods
 Gowk Bank
 Great Asby Scar
 Hallsenna Moor
 High Leys
 Moor House-Upper Teesdale
 North Fen
 North Walney
 Park Wood
 Roudsea Wood & Mosses
 Rusland Moss
 Sandscale Haws
 Sandybeck Meadow
 Smardale Gill
 South Solway Mosses(Bowness Common, Glasson Moss, Wedholme Flow SSSI's)
 Tarn Moss
 Thornhill Moss and Meadows
 Walton Moss
 Whitbarrow

See also

National nature reserves in England
Natural England

References

 Cumbria
Nature reserves in Cumbria